The 1992 Royal Rumble was the fifth annual Royal Rumble professional wrestling pay-per-view (PPV) event produced by the World Wrestling Federation (WWF, now WWE). It took place on January 19, 1992, at the Knickerbocker Arena in Albany, New York. It centered on the Royal Rumble match, a modified battle royal in which participants enter at timed intervals instead of all beginning in the ring at the same time.

Six matches were contested at the event, including one dark match. The main event was the 1992 Royal Rumble match. This Royal Rumble match was notable as for the first time, the winner would win the WWF World Heavyweight Championship, which had been vacated in December 1991. Ric Flair would start at number 3,  Sid Justice would enter at number 29 while The Undertaker and Hulk Hogan would enter at numbers 20 and 26 respectively. In other featured matches on the undercard, The Natural Disasters (Earthquake and Typhoon) had a  WWF Tag Team Championship match against current champions The Legion of Doom (Hawk and Animal), The Beverly Brothers (Blake Beverly and Beau Beverly) took on in a tag team match The Bushwhackers (Bushwhacker Luke and Bushwhacker Butch), and Roddy Piper took on current WWF Intercontinental Heavyweight Champion The Mountie with the title on the line.

Production

Background
The Royal Rumble is an annual gimmick pay-per-view (PPV), produced every January by the World Wrestling Federation (WWF, now WWE) since 1988. It is one of the promotion's original four pay-per-views, along with WrestleMania, SummerSlam, and Survivor Series, which were dubbed the "Big Four". It is named after the Royal Rumble match, a modified battle royal in which the participants enter at timed intervals instead of all beginning in the ring at the same time. The 1992 event was the fifth event in the Royal Rumble chronology and was scheduled to be held on January 19, 1992, at the Knickerbocker Arena in Albany, New York.

The Royal Rumble match generally features 30 wrestlers. Prior to 1992, there was no prize for winning the match. However, as the WWF World Heavyweight Championship had been vacated, the vacant title became the prize of the 1992 Royal Rumble match. It was the first of only two times in which the promotion's world championship was the prize of the Royal Rumble match—the second occurred at the 2016 event.

Event 

The card consisted of five matches. The matches resulted from scripted storylines, where wrestlers portrayed heroes, villains, or less distinguishable characters to build tension and culminated in a wrestling match or series of matches. Results were predetermined by WWF's writers, with storylines produced on their weekly television shows, Superstars, Wrestling Challenge, and Prime Time Wrestling.

Prior to the event, it was announced the winner of the Royal Rumble would win the vacant WWF World Heavyweight Championship, which had been stripped from Hulk Hogan after two controversial title switches between Hogan and the Undertaker, first at the 1991 Survivor Series and later at the Tuesday in Texas pay-per-view event. Hogan and The Undertaker were among the 30 entrants in the event. WWF president Jack Tunney gave Hogan and Undertaker an advantage in the random draw to determine the order in which wrestlers would enter the ring, promising them numbers between 20 and 30.

The Royal Rumble match helped begin Justice's slow-building turn into a villain. Justice – who was returning from a recent injury – entered at No. 29 and was among the final four wrestlers, along with Hogan, Randy Savage, although he jumped outside the ring to hit  Jake the Snake Roberts and Flair. Justice eliminated Savage and then Hogan, leaving himself and Flair in the ring. During the initial live pay-per-view broadcast, Justice's elimination of Hogan was loudly cheered by the audience in attendance even though, as per storyline plans, Sid "sneaked up from behind" to throw Hogan out. As such, the original reaction was edited out of future television replays as well as the Coliseum home video release of the event, with play-by-play announcer Gorilla Monsoon adding new comments condemning Sid for his actions (Monsoon had originally said Justice's elimination of Hogan was fair). Hogan, who was still at ringside after being eliminated, grabbed Sid's arm and distracted him long enough for Flair to eliminate him to win the match and become the new WWF World Heavyweight Champion. After the match, Sid and Hogan got into an argument in the ring and had to be separated by security.

In his book, To Be The Man, Ric Flair mentions not knowing he was going to be winning the Royal Rumble (WWF Title) until arriving at the arena the day of the event, and also felt he was brought in at number three in order to showcase his skills and endurance to the WWF audience, who may not have watched his work in Jim Crockett Promotions and World Championship Wrestling.  Meanwhile, Bobby Heenan mentioned in his autobiography, Bobby The Brain, that it was his initial suggestion that Flair enter the Rumble at number one for dramatic purposes, and that Vince McMahon changed it to number three and claimed it as his own idea.

Results

Royal Rumble entrances and eliminations
A new entrant came out approximately every 2 minutes.

Randy Savage eliminated himself shortly after eliminating Jake Roberts by jumping to Roberts over the top rope. However, he returned to the ring and resumed his participation.

Hulk Hogan was already eliminated and grabbed onto Sid's arm while Flair snuck up behind and lifted Sid over the ropes.

Aftermath
The confrontation between Hogan and Justice was played out over a series of future WWF television programs. On the Superstars program aired January 25, 1992, WWF President Jack Tunney held a press conference, where he announced that Hogan would face Flair for the WWF World Heavyweight Championship at WrestleMania VIII. Justice, who was also in attendance and began standing up as if Tunney were about to proclaim him the top contender, was outraged and termed the announcement "the most bogus act Jack Tunney has ever pulled off." Sid later apologized and Hogan accepted, but on the February 8 Saturday Night's Main Event XXX, Justice abandoned Hogan during a tag-team match against Flair and The Undertaker, completing his heel turn and leading to a match at WrestleMania VIII.

Flair, meanwhile, began feuding with Savage over the WWF World Heavyweight Championship. According to the storyline, Flair claimed that he had a previous relationship with Savage's wife, Miss Elizabeth, going as far as presenting pictures of Elizabeth in which Flair had himself superimposed. This culminated in a title match at WrestleMania VIII; Savage won the match and his second (and final) WWF World Heavyweight Championship.

This was the first Royal Rumble in which stakes were involved for the winner—the stipulation in which the winner would face the WWF/WWE World Heavyweight Champion at WrestleMania first took place at the following year's event. It would be 24 years before the Royal Rumble was again for the (now) WWE World Heavyweight Championship, and the first match in which the champion—Roman Reigns—defended his title in the Rumble match. That match was won by Triple H.

References

External links
Official website

1992
Events in New York (state)
1992 in New York (state)
1992 WWF pay-per-view events
January 1992 events in the United States
Events in Albany, New York
Professional wrestling in Albany, New York